"Give It Up, Turn It Loose" is a song by American R&B/pop vocal group En Vogue, released as the fourth single from their second album, Funky Divas (1992). The song's title is a reference to the 1969 James Brown song "Give It Up or Turnit a Loose". Released on November 12, 1992, the single reached number 15 on the US Billboard Hot 100, number 16 on the Billboard Hot R&B Singles chart, and number 22 on the UK Singles Chart. In 1994, it was nominated for a Grammy Award for Best R&B Performance by a Duo or Group with Vocals. This song features Maxine Jones on lead entirely.

Critical reception
AllMusic editor Jose F. Promis described "Give It Up, Turn It Loose" as a "doo wop good-feelin'"-song. Daryl Easlea for BBC noted its "smooth old-school groove". Larry Flick from Billboard felt that here, the group vocally "glides with ease over a languid, retro-soul shuffle beat. Jazzy flutes and restrained funk guitars add texture that will warm the hearts of pop and urban folks alike." Randy Clark from Cashbox stated, "Although they use the same basic sound and style, these Funky Divas have opted for a more smooth and kicked back approach on this track, compared to their current spirited hit single, with an over-all vibe that's slightly reminiscent of Cheryl Lynn's "Got to Be Real"." John Martinucci from the Gavin Report found that "Maxine and the girls are giving some sisterly advice for those who are stuck in dead end relationships", calling it a "down-tempo track".

In his weekly UK chart commentary, James Masterton wrote, "If anything "Give It Up" has less to recommend it than some of the others and so is unlikely to end up one of their bigger hits." Pan-European magazine Music & Media commented, "In which direction will the catwalk lead this time? To soul music a la the Pointer Sisters, or four Mariah Careys." Parry Gettelman from Orlando Sentinel declared the "mid-tempo workout" as "a neat kiss-off song". In an retrospective review, Pop Rescue called it "such a funky track". Mark Sutherland from Smash Hits gave it four out of five, adding, "Not quite as snazzy as their last two hits, but still rather fabulous. The four Voguestresses strut about funkily and inform us that "love knocks you on your behind" in such a poignant fashion that you can only nod sagely and mutter 'how true'." Cheo H. Coker from Stanford Daily named it "perhaps the most enjoyable on the album; the jam is the catchiest thing since its Debarge predecessor, "I Like It", from which it takes its inspiration."

Music video
The accompanying music video for "Give It Up, Turn It Loose" was directed by German feature film director and producer Marcus Nispel. It is made in black-and-white and features the group performing in a beauty parlor while clips of life in the city play throughout the video. It was later published on YouTube in April 2015, and had generated more than 1.1 million views as of February 2023.

Track listings

 US cassette single
 "Give It Up, Turn It Loose" (LP edit)
 "You Don't Have to Worry" (club remix)

 US maxi-single
 "Turn It Loose" (Kevin's Extended R&B Mix) – 5:17
 "Turn It Loose" ("Welcome to the Ghetto" Hip Hop Mix) – 5:26
 "Turn It Loose" (Kevin's Extended Jazz Mix) – 4:58
 "Turn It Loose" (Somethin' for the People Remix) – 5:50

 UK CD single
 "Give It Up, Turn It Loose" (LP edit) – 4:05
 "Free Your Mind" (Theo's Rap and Wreck Mix) – 5:41
 "Hold On" (radio version with intro) – 5:02
 "Give It Up, Turn It Loose" (Kevin's Jazz Mix) – 4:20

 UK 7-inch vinyl
A. "Give It Up, Turn It Loose" (LP edit) – 4:05
B. "Free Your Mind" (Theo's Rec & Wreck Remix) – 5:41

Charts

Weekly charts

Year-end charts

Release history

References

1992 singles
1992 songs
Black-and-white music videos
East West Records singles
En Vogue songs
Music videos directed by Marcus Nispel
Songs written by Denzil Foster
Songs written by Thomas McElroy
Song recordings produced by Foster & McElroy